Findhorn may refer to:

 Toponyms re northern Scotland:
 Findhorn,  village 
 Findhorn Bay
 River Findhorn
 Institutions connected with the village
 Findhorn Foundation, an intentional community
 Findhorn Press, a publisher founded by the Findhorn Foundation, now an imprint of Inner Traditions – Bear & Company
 Findhorn Ecovillage
 Other:
 HMS Findhorn (K301), a ship of the Royal Navy
 Viscount Stuart of Findhorn